Real Club Deportivo de La Coruña Femenino is the women's football section of Deportivo de La Coruña, club based in the city of A Coruña (Galicia, Spain), that currently plays in Primera Federación. Currently also receives the name of Deportivo ABANCA for sponsorship reasons.

History

Karbo Deportivo (1983–1988)

Deportivo entered in the women's football in the winter of 1983-84 after absorbing Karbo C.F. that changed its name to Karbo Deportivo completely integrated into the structure of Deportivo de La Coruña, also using the colors and shield of Deportivo. The team won the first official women's football competitions in Spain (the current Copa de la Reina, called Spanish Championship before the foundation of the women's football league) until 1985.

The section was dissolved in 1988 due to the economic problems that the R.C. Deportivo, plunged into a suffocating debt and with the men's team on the verge of relegation to Segunda División B, as well as an increase in expenses for the increasing professionalization of women's football, a year before Superliga was created.

2016–present: recovery of the women's section
On 16 March 2016, Deportivo announced the recovery of the women's club section. The new club started playing its first season in Segunda División, after an agreement with local team Orzán SD Deportivo to occupy his place forming a stronger Galician team, and in its debut as Deportivo Femenino ended as runner-up of the Group 1. In the 2017/18 season the team was renamed Deportivo ABANCA after an agreement with the bank for 4 years.

After three years, on 19 May 2019, Deportivo achieved promotion to Primera División for the first time ever.

Their first season in the Primera División was cut short on 8 May 2020, due to the RFEF choosing to suspend non-professional football during the COVID-19 pandemic. With this cancellation, they finished the season with an unprecedented fourth place. In the 2021-22 season, Depor finished 15th was relegated to the Segunda División Pro.

Season by season

Karbo CF

Deportivo La Coruña

Honours

Karbo CF
Domestic
 Copa de la Reina (3): 1983, 1984, 1985
 Copa de la Reina (unofficial editions) (2): 1981, 1982
Regional
 Copa Galicia (1): 1987
 Galician League (5): 1982–83, 1983–84, 1984–85, 1985–86, 1986-87

Deportivo La Coruña
Domestic
 Second division (1): 2018–2019
Regional
 Copa Galicia (2): 2018, 2019
 Copa Deputación (4): 2016, 2017, 2018, 2019
Friendly 
 Teresa Herrera Trophy (2): 2016, 2020

Players

Current squad
As of 2 July 2020

Reserve team

References

External links
Official website

Women's football clubs in Spain
Football clubs in Galicia (Spain)
Deportivo de La Coruña
Segunda Federación (women) clubs
Primera División (women) clubs
Association football clubs established in 2016
2016 establishments in Spain
Primera Federación (women) clubs